The first season of SEAL Team, an American military drama television series, premiered on CBS on September 27, 2017, and ended on May 16, 2018, with a total of 22 episodes. Created by Benjamin Cavell, the series follows an elite unit of United States Navy SEALs portrayed by David Boreanaz, Max Thieriot, Jessica Paré, Neil Brown Jr., A. J. Buckley, and Toni Trucks.

CBS ordered another Navy SEAL project in January 2017 following the success of History Channel's Six. Boreanaz was cast in the lead in March 2017 after Jim Caviezel left the project the same month. The pilot was ordered to series, and was titled SEAL Team in May.

The first season of SEAL Team ranked #28 with an average of 9.87 million viewers. On March 27, 2018, CBS renewed the series for a second season which premiered on October 3, 2018.

Cast and characters

Main 
 David Boreanaz as Master Chief Special Warfare Operator Jason Hayes a.k.a. Bravo 1/1B
 Max Thieriot as Special Warfare Operator Second Class Clay Spenser a.k.a. Bravo 6/6B
 Jessica Paré as Amanda "Mandy" Ellis
 Neil Brown Jr. as Senior Chief Special Warfare Operator Raymond "Ray" Perry, a.k.a. Bravo 2/2B
 A. J. Buckley as Special Warfare Operator First Class Sonny Quinn a.k.a. Bravo 3/3B
 Toni Trucks as Logistics Specialist First Class Lisa Davis

Recurring 
 Judd Lormand as Lieutenant Commander Eric Blackburn
 Tyler Grey as Special Warfare Operator First Class Trent Sawyer a.k.a. Bravo 4/4B
 Jusitin Melnick as Special Warfare Operator First Class Brock Reynolds a.k.a. Bravo 5/5B
 Michaela McManus as Alana Hayes
 Kerri Medders as Emma Hayes
 Parisa Fakhri as Naima Perry
 Ammon Jacob Ford as Michael "Mikey" Hayes
 Alona Tal as Stella Baxter
 Michael Irby as Master Chief Special Warfare Operator Adam Siever
 Jay Hayden as Brian Armstrong
 Steve Howey as Danny Cooper
 Scott Foxx as Senior Chief Special Warfare Operator Scott "Full Metal" Carter a.k.a. Alpha 1/1A

Guest 
 Daniel Gillies as Nate Massey
 Michael Rooker as Big Chief
 Sharif Atkins as Senior Chief Special Warfare Operator Beau Fuller
 C. Thomas Howell as Retired Senior Chief Special Warfare Operator Ash Spenser
 Note:

Episodes

Production

Development 
Following the success of History Channel's Six, on January 27, 2017, it was announced that CBS had given the pilot order for another Navy SEAL project. The episode was written and authored by Benjamin Cavell who was expected to be an executive producer, alongside Ed Redlich, Sarah Timberman, Carl Beverly, Christopher Chulack. Production companies involved with the pilot include Chulack Productions, East 25 C, Timberman/Beverly Productions and CBS Television Studios. On May 12, 2017, CBS officially ordered the pilot to series. A few days later, it was announced that the series, now titled SEAL Team, would premiere by September 27, 2017, and air on Wednesdays at 9:00 P.M.

The series received a full-season order on October 12, 2017, bringing the first season to a total of 22 episodes.

Casting 
On March 14, 2017, it was announced that Jim Caviezel would topline CBS' then-untitled Navy SEAL drama pilot but on March 22, 2017, it was announced that David Boreanaz had been cast in the pilot's lead role of Jason, replacing Caviezel; Boreanaz originally declined the series after finishing his 12-year run on Foxs Bones. However, he later changed his mind after Caviezel left due to creative differences. On March 8, 2017, it was reported that A.J. Buckley would play Sonny.

Filming 
Filming for the pilot episode took place between March and April 2017 in New Orleans.

Ratings

Home media

References 

2017 American television seasons
2018 American television seasons